Gil Kola (also Romanized as Gīl Kolā and Gīl Kalā; also known as  Gīl Kalā-ye Zānūsrestāq, Gīl Kolā-ye Zānū Sar Tāq, Gīl Kolā-ye Zānūs Rostāq, and Gil Kola Zanoos Rastagh) is a village in Zanus Rastaq Rural District, Kojur District, Nowshahr County, Mazandaran Province, Iran. At the 2006 census, its population was 45, in 20 families.

References 

Populated places in Nowshahr County